Tetley's Super League VIII was the official name for the year 2003's Super League championship season, the 109th season of top-level professional rugby league held in Britain, and the eighth championship run by Super League.

The season culminated in a replay of the 2001 Grand Final between Bradford Bulls and Wigan Warriors, and again Bradford won, claiming the 2003 premiership, their second in three years.

Rule changes
 The knock-on rule was modified so that if in the referee's judgement a player did not play at the ball, a knock-on would not be given.
 Super League coaches voted 12-0 for new interchange and substitution rules for the 2003 season. The number of interchanges, which now included blood bins, increased from 6 to 12 using a pool of 4 substitutes. This change aimed to retain the element of wearing down a team's opponents during the game - which was considered part of the character of the sport. Stuart Cummings, the Rugby Football League's technical controller said the changes "bring us into line with the international rules" and ruled out future increases as well as declaring, "We will never see the unlimited interchange introduced into rugby league in Britain," a change that had caused controversy in Australia during its experiment there.

Table

Play-offs

Source: Rugby League Project

Grand Final

Media

Television
This season was the final year of Sky Sports' contract with the Rugby Football League allowing them to broadcast matches exclusively live, the deal ended in November 2003.

Records

On 2 March, Matt Crowther of Hull F.C. equalled the club record for goals in a match when he was successful 14 times against Sheffield Eagles.

2003 Transfers

Players

See also
2003 Super League Grand Final
2003 World Club Challenge

References

External links
Super League VIII at wigan.rlfans.com
Super League VIII at rugbyleagueproject.com